In mathematics, Clarkson's inequalities, named after James A. Clarkson, are results in the theory of Lp spaces.  They give bounds for the Lp-norms of the sum and difference of two measurable functions in Lp in terms of the Lp-norms of those functions individually.

Statement of the inequalities

Let (X, Σ, μ) be a measure space; let f, g : X → R be measurable functions in Lp.  Then, for 2 ≤ p < +∞,

For 1 < p < 2,

where

i.e., q = p ⁄ (p − 1).

The case p ≥ 2 is somewhat easier to prove, being a simple application of the triangle inequality and the convexity of

References
.
.
.

External links
 

Banach spaces
Inequalities
Measure theory
Lp spaces